Nong Han is a tambon (subdistrict) of San Sai District, in Chiang Mai Province, Thailand. In 2005 it had a population of 16,463 people. The tambon contains 13 villages.

References

Tambon of Chiang Mai province
Populated places in Chiang Mai province